Frankfurt Charterhouse was a Carthusian monastery or charterhouse in Frankfurt an der Oder in Brandenburg, Germany.

History 
The first monks settled in Frankfurt in the following year.

In 1432 the monastery was destroyed by the Hussites. Eleven monks are documented in 1506. The charterhouse possessed three vineyards, employed a wine manager (Weinmeister) and ran an extensive wine trade. It also had a brandy distillery and a beer brewery. In 1534 the monastery was the subject of a visitation. In 1538 it still owned one vineyard and the villages of Brieskow and Lindow as well as the Brieskower See, abundant in fish.

The Reformation was introduced in Mark Brandenburg in 1539. In the following year Elector Joachim II granted all the possessions of the charterhouse to the Brandenburg University Frankfurt, including the monastic library, and all buildings, lands and estates. The remaining monks had the right to live in the monastery for the rest of their lives, but were forbidden to accept novices. The last prior was Peter Golitz. The last monk died in 1568.

The monastery buildings were used as a quarry. (The fruit from the gardens was given to the professors of Frankfurt University). In 1631 the remains of the buildings were burnt down during the siege by the Swedes.

Documents concerning the monastery are in the Stadtarchiv Frankfurt (Oder) and the Brandenburgisches Landeshauptarchiv. There are no visible remains of the buildings.

References

Further reading 
 Sönke Lorenz, Oliver Auge, Robert Zagolla, 2002: Bücher, Bibliotheken und Schriftkultur der Kartäuser - Festgabe zum 65. Geburtstag von Edward Potkowski. Stuttgart: Franz Steiner Verlag

Carthusian monasteries in Germany
Monasteries in Brandenburg
Buildings and structures in Frankfurt (Oder)